The Langworthy Professor is the holder of an endowed chair in the School of Physics and Astronomy at the University of Manchester, UK.

History 
It was founded by a bequest of £10,000 for the purpose of endowing a professorship of experimental physics by the businessman and politician E. R. Langworthy at Owens College, Manchester in 1874. Owens College later became the Victoria University of Manchester (1904) and then the University of Manchester (2004).

Langworthy Professors 
Several Langworthy Professors have been Nobel Laureates, including Ernest Rutherford, Lawrence Bragg, Patrick Blackett, Andre Geim and Konstantin Novoselov.

 1874–87 Balfour Stewart
 1887–1907 Sir Arthur Schuster
 1907–19 Sir Ernest Rutherford
 1919–37 Sir William Lawrence Bragg
 1937–53 Patrick Blackett
 1955–60 Samuel Devons
 1961–72 Brian Flowers
 1987–90 Francis Graham-Smith
 1998–2001 Frank Read
 2001–07 Andrew Lyne
 2007–13 Sir Andre Geim
 2013–present Sir Konstantin Novoselov

References

Physics education in the United Kingdom
Professorships in physics
Professorships at the University of Manchester